This is a list of American films released in 2017.

Box office 
The highest-grossing American films released in 2017, by domestic box office gross revenue, are as follows:

January–March

April–June

July–September

October–December

See also
 List of 2017 box office number-one films in the United States
 2017 in the United States

References

External links

 

Films
Lists of 2017 films by country or language
2017